Monchiero is a comune (municipality) in the Province of Cuneo in the Italian region Piedmont, located about  southeast of Turin and about  northeast of Cuneo.

Monchiero borders the following municipalities: Dogliani, Lequio Tanaro, Monforte d'Alba, and Novello.

Demographic evolution

References 

Cities and towns in Piedmont